Leonora Edith Lea (30 March 1896 – 28 October 1971) was a Canadian Anglican missionary who lived and worked in Japan as a school teacher, writer and senior administrator of the Anglican Church in Japan.

Lea was one of the few church missionary workers to live in Japan throughout the Pacific War. Her collected writings and recollections of that period offer a rare first hand English language accounts of life in wartime Japan.

With Bishop Michael Hinsuke Yashiro, Lea is credited as the founder of St. Michael's International School, Kobe.

Early life and career
Born 30 March 1896 in New Glasgow, Nova Scotia, Canada, the eldest of seven children born to Reverend Arthur and Mary Lea. In 1897 her father volunteered to serve in Toyohashi, Gifu Prefecture, Japan as a missionary for the Nippon Sei Ko Kai.  Arthur Lea was subsequently consecrated as Bishop of the Kyushu in 1908.

Lea attended Cheltenham Ladies' College and studied for BA degree as an external student of the University of London. Returning to Japan in 1927 she worked as SPG sponsored educational missionary in Kobe assigned to the Shoin Girls School.

During the war period Lea elected to remain in Japan and coordinated emergency relief and food distribution efforts for the foreign community in Kobe. Lea subsequently served as an executive assistant to Presiding Bishop of the Anglican Church in Japan, Bishop Michael Hinsuke Yashiro.

In 1969 she was honoured by the Japanese Government and awarded the 4th class Order of the Sacred Treasure.

Lea died on 28 October 1971 in Sydenham, England.

Published work
 Window on Japan, Seabury Press (1956)

References

Anglican missionaries in Japan
People educated at Cheltenham Ladies' College
Canadian Anglican missionaries
People from New Glasgow, Nova Scotia
1896 births
1971 deaths
Canadian expatriates in Japan
Female Christian missionaries